The 2012 NCAA Division I Cross Country Championships were the 74th annual NCAA Men's Division I Cross Country Championship and the 32nd annual NCAA Women's Division I Cross Country Championship to determine the team and individual national champions of NCAA Division I men's and women's collegiate cross country running in the United States. In all, four different titles were contested: men's and women's individual and team championships.

Held on November 17, 2012, the combined meet was hosted by the University of Louisville at E. P. "Tom" Sawyer State Park in Louisville, Kentucky. The distance for the men's race was 10 kilometers (6.21 miles) while the distance for the women's race was 6 kilometers (3.73 miles). 

The men's team championship was won by Oklahoma State (72 points), the Cowboys' third overall and third in four years. The women's team championship was won by Oregon (114 points), the Ducks' third and first since 1987.

The two individual champions were, for the men, Kennedy Kithuka (Texas Tech, 28:31.3) and, for the women, Betsy Saina (Iowa State, 19:27.9).

Men's title
Distance: 10,000 meters

Men's Team Result (Top 10)

Men's Individual Result (Top 10)

Women's title
Distance: 6,000 meters

Women's Team Result (Top 10)

Women's Individual Result (Top 10)

References
 

NCAA Cross Country Championships
NCAA Division I Cross Country Championships
NCAA Division I Cross Country Championships
NCAA Division I Cross Country Championships
Sports competitions in Louisville, Kentucky
Track and field in Kentucky
University of Louisville